Robert Francis McMullan (born 10 December 1947) is an Australian former politician who represented the Australian Labor Party in both the Senate and the House of Representatives. He was the first person to represent the Australian Capital Territory in both houses of federal parliament

Early life
McMullan was born in Perth, Western Australia, and educated at Governor Stirling Senior High School and the University of Western Australia where he studied economics and arts. Active in the movement against the Vietnam War, he was conscripted for military service in 1968 but successfully argued in court that he was a conscientious objector. He became an industrial advocate for the trade unions, joining the Labor Party in 1973.

Labor Party involvement
In 1975, McMullan became the Labor Party's Western Australian State Secretary. In 1981, he was elected National Secretary of the Labor Party and he directed the ALP's three successful election campaigns in 1983, 1984 and 1987. He remains the most successful National Secretary of the Labor Party ever.

Parliamentary career
On 16 February 1988, McMullan was chosen by a joint sitting of the House of Representatives and the Senate to fill a casual vacancy in the representation of the Australian Capital Territory in the Senate, caused by the resignation of Susan Ryan. This was the second (and last) time that a territory senate vacancy was filled in this way.

McMullan was Parliamentary Secretary to the Treasurer 1990–93, Minister for the Arts and Minister for Administrative Services 1993–94, Minister for Administrative Services 1994 and Minister for Trade 1994–96 in the government of Paul Keating.

As Arts Minister he was shadowed by Opposition leader John Hewson who had appointed himself as Shadow Arts Minister.

On 6 February 1996 he resigned his Senate seat in order to contest the Division of Canberra in the House of Representatives at the March election; he was successful. The Keating government having been defeated by John Howard, Labor went into opposition and McMullan was elected as a member of the Opposition Shadow Ministry. In 1998, following a redistribution, McMullan moved to the neighbouring seat of Fraser. 

McMullan became Manager of Opposition Business (opposite number to the Leader of the House) in 1998, and following Labor's 2001 electoral defeat he was made Shadow Treasurer. In July 2003 McMullan was replaced as Shadow Treasurer by Mark Latham and relegated to the post of Shadow Minister for Finance, taking on additional responsibility for Reconciliation and Indigenous Affairs. McMullan then became Shadow Minister for Finance and Shadow Minister for Small Business. 

In Question Time in Parliament, McMullan gained a reputation for repeatedly asking the same question in different words if he did not get a direct answer.  After the 2004 election, McMullan did not stand for election to the Shadow Cabinet, in what was widely seen as an expression of lack of confidence in the leadership of Mark Latham.

Following the election of Kevin Rudd on 4 December 2006 as Opposition Leader in place of Kim Beazley, McMullan returned to the front bench in the junior role of Labor spokesperson on Federal-State Relations, the reform of which was one of Rudd's declared priorities.

In the 2007 federal election McMullan held his seat of Fraser, albeit with a two-party preferred swing to Labor of less than 2%, one-third of the national average swing to Labor.

When the First Rudd Ministry was sworn in on 3 December 2007, McMullan was given the junior post of Parliamentary Secretary for International Development Assistance. On 19 January 2010, McMullan announced he would not contest the next federal election. He retired prior to the 2010 federal election.

External links
 Biographical and other Details on Official Labor Party Web Site; accessed 15 September 2008.

References

 

1947 births
Living people
Australian conscientious objectors
Australian Labor Party members of the Parliament of Australia
Members of the Australian Senate
Members of the Australian Senate for the Australian Capital Territory
Members of the Cabinet of Australia
Members of the Australian House of Representatives
Members of the Australian House of Representatives for Canberra
Members of the Australian House of Representatives for Fraser (ACT)
21st-century Australian politicians
20th-century Australian politicians
Australian Labor Party officials